Pseudomegacoelum beckeri is a genus of capsid bugs in the tribe Mirini; it is the type species in its new genus, having previously been placed in the genus Megacoelum Fieber, 1858.  This species is widespread throughout Europe, including the British Isles, where it can be found on Scots pine: Pinus sylvestris.

See also
List of heteropteran bugs recorded in Britain

References

External links
 "Megacoelum beckeri" at Flickr

Hemiptera of Europe
Mirini